The Taylor Swift masters controversy refers to the dispute of American singer-songwriter Taylor Swift with her former record label, Big Machine Records, its founder Scott Borchetta, and new owner Scooter Braun, over the ownership of the master recordings of her first six studio albums. It is a highly publicized conflict, drawing widespread attention and media coverage since its ignition in 2019.

Swift signed a record deal with Republic Records in November 2018 after her Big Machine contract expired. Mainstream media reported in June 2019 that Braun has purchased Big Machine from Borchetta for US$330 million, funded by various private equity firms. Braun became the owner of all of the masters, videos and artworks copyrighted by Big Machine, including those of Swift's first six studio albums. In response, Swift stated she tried to buy the masters but Big Machine had offered unfavorable conditions, and that she knew the label would sell them to someone else but did not expect Braun as the buyer, recalling him being an "incessant, manipulative bully". Borchetta claimed that Swift declined an opportunity to buy the masters.

Consequently, Big Machine and Swift were embroiled in a series of disagreements leading to further friction; Swift alleged that the label blocked her from using her music for the 2019 American Music Awards and documentary Miss Americana (2020), while Big Machine released Live from Clear Channel Stripped 2008 (2020), an unreleased work by Swift, without her approval. Swift announced she would re-record the six albums to gain complete ownership over them. In October 2020, Braun sold the masters to the Disney family's investment firm, Shamrock Holdings, for $405 million on the condition that he keeps earning from the masters. Swift expressed her disapproval again, rejecting Shamrock's offer for an equity partnership, and began releasing the re-recorded music via Republic. She released Fearless (Taylor's Version) and Red (Taylor's Version), the re-recordings of her albums Fearless (2008) and Red (2012), in 2021 to critical and commercial success, breaking multiple sales, streaming and chart records. One of the tracks—"All Too Well (10 Minute Version)"—became the longest song ever to top the Billboard Hot 100, giving Swift her eighth number-one song. "Wildest Dreams (Taylor's Version)" and "This Love (Taylor's Version)" have also been released. Swift was the global best-selling soloist and highest-earning musician of 2021.

Various musicians, journalists, politicians and scholars supported Swift's stance, prompting a discourse on artists' rights, intellectual property, private equity, and ethics in the music industry. Publications described her response and move to re-record as influential measures, encouraging new artists to negotiate for greater ownership of their music. iHeartRadio, the largest radio network in the US, proclaimed it will replace the older versions in its airplay with Swift's re-recorded tracks. Billboard named Swift the Greatest Pop Star of 2021 for the successful and unprecedented outcomes of her re-recording venture. Braun has stated he regrets buying Swift's masters and Big Machine at large, and subsequently sold his entire holding company, Ithaca, to Hybe Corporation.

Background

Law 
According to the U.S. copyright law, any music recording, vocal or instrumental, is subject to two types of copyrights: one that protects the specific audio file developed in a recording studio, known as the master, and the other protecting the musical work of the song before it became a recording. The master is the first recording of the music, from which copies are made for sales and distribution. The owner of the master, therefore, owns the copyright to all formats of the recording, such as digital versions for download or streaming, or physical versions like CDs and vinyl LPs. A party who wishes to use or reproduce a recording must obtain a copyright license authorized by the master-owner. Before the emergence of digital platforms, musicians relied on record labels to promote their music through means such as airplay or physical distributions to retailers. Labels would typically require artists to give them the rights to the masters "in perpetuity". On the other hand, owning the musical work is referred to as the publishing rights, which covers the lyrics before it became a sound recording—its melodies, sheet music, composition, and instrumental arrangements. Songwriters generally own the publishing rights, and are referred to as "publishers" of the music.

Context 
Taylor Swift is an American singer-songwriter from Wyomissing, Pennsylvania. In 2003, at age 13, she visited major record labels in Nashville, Tennessee, for record deals but was rejected. In 2004, Swift performed original songs at an RCA Records showcase, and received an artist development deal, following which she moved to Nashville and worked with experienced Music Row songwriters such as Troy Verges, Brett Beavers, Brett James, Mac McAnally, and the Warren Brothers. In 2005, she became the youngest artist (age 15) signed by the Sony/ATV Tree publishing house, but left the Sony-owned RCA Records due to her concerns that "development deals may shelve artists". Later in 2005, Swift participated in an industry showcase at Nashville's Bluebird Café, where she was noticed by a DreamWorks Records executive, Scott Borchetta, who had an idea of establishing his own independent record label. Eventually, Swift signed a 13-year recording deal with Borchetta's new Nashville-based label, Big Machine Records, as its first recording artist. The deal gave Big Machine the ownership of the masters to Swift's first six albums in exchange for a cash advance.

From 2006 to 2017, Swift released six studio albums with Big Machine: Taylor Swift (2006), Fearless (2008), Speak Now (2010), Red (2012), 1989 (2014), and Reputation (2017), all of which were commercially lucrative and established Swift as one of the most successful music artists in history. Although Big Machine owned the masters, Swift retained the publishing rights to the albums due to her role as the main songwriter of all of the songs she had released under the label. This would allow her to re-record the songs in the future if she desired, as per the artist-label agreement that limits the artist from re-recording a song for a fixed period of time; Swift would not have been able to re-record her musical work had she not been a songwriter.

In August 2018, as per Billboard, Swift's attorney Donald Passman and her management team proposed to Big Machine Label Group that the masters be sold back to Swift as their contract was nearing expiration; the label group responded that it would happen only if she renewed her recording contract with Big Machine, agreeing to create more albums under the label for the next decade. The two parties never arrived at an agreement.

Ultimately, Swift's contract with Big Machine Records expired in November 2018, following which she signed a new, global contract with Republic Records, a New York-based label owned by Universal Music Group. Variety reported that Swift's catalog constituted around 80 percent of Big Machine's revenue. Swift revealed a negotiation as part of her Republic contract—any sale of Universal's shares in Spotify, the largest on-demand music streaming platform in the world, resulted in equity shares for all of Universal's artists on a non-recoupable basis. The contract also allowed Swift to fully own the albums distributed by the label—both the masters and the publishing rights—starting with her seventh studio album, Lover (2019), and as reported by Forbes, offered a royalty payment of 50 percent or more compared to the 10 to 15 percent Swift "likely" had been receiving from Big Machine.

Dispute

Acquisition by Braun 

Scooter Braun is an American media proprietor, talent manager and businessman known for managing the careers of music artists Justin Bieber, Ariana Grande, Demi Lovato and Kanye West, through his media company, SB Projects. In June 2019, The Wall Street Journal, followed by other mainstream media, reported that Braun's holding company, Ithaca Holdings LLC., had fully acquired Big Machine Label Group by purchasing it for an estimated $330 million. The purchase encompassed all aspects of Big Machine's business, including its client roster, distribution deals, publishing rights and music masters, and was financed by American private equity companies such as the Carlyle Group, 23 Capital, and Soros Fund Management, all of whom owned a stake in Ithaca. In a joint announcement, the companies claimed that the buyout "creates one of the most powerful label, management, streaming, publishing and media companies by combining complimentary services, artists, executives and expertise". As part of the acquisition, the ownership of all of the masters and copyrights owned by Big Machine, including those of Swift's first six studio albums, transferred to Braun. Borchetta joined the Ithaca board of directors, acquiring a minority interest in Ithaca, and remained as the President and CEO of Big Machine.

Swift's response 

On June 30, 2019, Big Machine announced via social media that the label group had been acquired by Braun, following which Swift denounced the acquisition on Tumblr the same day. She stated that she had tried to buy her masters for years, but was not given a chance unless she signed another contract that would require her to create six more albums under the label in exchange for the masters of the first six, which she felt was "unacceptable". While she knew that Big Machine was for sale, she said she was unaware that Braunwhom she described as an "incessant, manipulative bully"would be the buyer: "Essentially, my musical legacy is about to lie in the hands of someone who tried to dismantle it". She highlighted Braun's involvement in the creation of West's music video for his 2016 single "Famous", which she described as "a revenge porn music video which strips [her] body naked". Swift also claimed that Braun influenced Kim Kardashian, then-married to West, to orchestrate an "illegally recorded" snippet of Swift's phone call with West, and had "two of [Braun's] clients" collude to bully Swift online, referring to a FaceTime screenshot of Bieber, West and Braun, posted to Bieber's Instagram after Kardashian released the snippet. Swift accused Borchetta of betraying her loyalty for selling the masters to Braun despite being aware of Braun's role in bullying Swift. Passman argued that Borchetta never gave Swift "an opportunity to purchase her masters, or the label, outright with a check in the way [Borchetta] is now apparently doing for others".

Borchetta's reply 
In response, Borchetta published a blog post titled "It's Time For Some Truth" on the Big Machine website. On June 25, 2019, Big Machine shareholders and Braun's Ithaca Holdings held a phone call regarding the transaction. While Swift's father Scott was one of the label's minority shareholders (4 percent), he did not join the call due to a "very strict" non-disclosure agreement. A final call was held on June 28, when Scott Swift was represented by a lawyer from Swift's management company, 13 Management. Borchetta said he texted Swift on June 29, claiming that she was aware of Braun's transaction beforehand. He denied that Swift had been hostile toward Braun, and posted a text message he alleged Swift had sent before signing to Republic Records; in the message, Swift said she would accept another seven-year contract with Big Machine on the condition that she took ownership of her audiovisual works. Borchetta agreed, but asked for a ten-year contract. The authenticity of the message has not been verified.

Further strife 

On November 14, 2019, Swift accused Braun and Borchetta of preventing her from performing her older songs at the American Music Awards of 2019 and using older material for her 2020 documentary Miss Americana. She said they were "exercising tyrannical control" over her music, and claimed Borchetta told her team that she would be allowed to use the music only if she agreed to not re-record "copycat versions" of her songs; Swift commented, "the message being sent to me is very clear. Basically, be a good little girl and shut up. Or you'll be punished."

In response, Big Machine rejected Swift's claim, "we have worked diligently to have a conversation about these matters with Taylor and her team to productively move forward. However, despite our persistent efforts to find a private and mutually satisfactory solution, Taylor made a unilateral decision last night to enlist her fanbase." However, on November 18, the label issued a statement saying they had "agreed to grant all licenses of their artists' performances to stream post show and for re-broadcast on mutually approved platforms" for the AMAs, without naming Swift. It also stated that Big Machine negotiated with the AMAs producer, Dick Clark Productions. To the contrary, Dick Clark stated they never agreed to issue any statement with Big Machine.

Swift's publicist Tree Paine released a statement the next day. Paine said Swift avoided performing her older songs at the Tmall Double Eleven Gala 2020, a Singles Day event in Shanghai, China, and sang only three songs from Lover, because "it was clear that Big Machine Label Group felt any televised performance of catalog songs violated her agreement", attaching a screenshot of a portion of an alleged email from Big Machine that reads: "Please be advised that [Big Machine] will not agree to issue licenses for existing recordings or waivers of its re-recording restrictions in connection with these two projects: The Netflix documentary and The Alibaba 'Double Eleven' event." Paine also denied Big Machine's statement that said Swift "has admitted to contractually owing millions of dollars and multiple assets" to the label, and claimed the label is attempting to deflect from "the $7.9 million of unpaid royalties" that the label owes to Swift "over several years", as assessed by "an independent, professional auditor". Swift performed six songs at the 2019 AMAs on November 24, 2019, four of which were from her first six albums, and received the Artist of the Decade award.

In April 2020, Big Machine released Live from Clear Channel Stripped 2008, a live album of Swift's performances at a 2008 radio show. Swift said she did not authorize the release, and dismissed it as "just another case of shameless greed in the time of Coronavirus". Live from Clear Channel Stripped 2008 earned only 33 units in the US and did not chart anywhere. From August 2019 to January 2020, Big Machine released 4,000 vinyl LPs of each of the singles from Taylor Swift for the album's 13th anniversary, which was met with immediate backlash from Swift's supporters.

Aftermath 
Swift's solution to her crisis was to create new recordings of all of the musical work in the six albums, using the publishing rights she retained, and to have the finished product sound as close to the original as possible. She announced in August 2019, on a special episode of CBS News Sunday Morning with American journalist Tracy Smith, that she would "re-record" and release the six albums to own the complete rights herself, as soon as her Big Machine contract allowed her to. By re-recording, Swift is technically covering her own songs as new recordings, resulting in new masters she fully owns, enabling her to control the licensing of her songs for commercial use, known as synchronization, by evading the owners of the older masters and subsequently devaluing them.

Sale to Shamrock 
In October 2020, Braun sold the masters, associated videos and artworks to Shamrock Holdings, an American private equity firm owned by the Disney estate, for a reported $405 million. Swift stated that she attempted to negotiate with Braun, but that he offered her a chance to buy the masters back only if she signed an "ironclad" NDA that only allowed her to speak positively about Braun during the process; she refused to sign the NDA. She also claimed that Braun mandated Shamrock not to notify her about the sale until it is complete, and that she further declined an offer by Shamrock to become an equity partner, on the grounds that Braun and Ithaca Holdings would continue to financially benefit from her work. Swift upheld her original decision and began the re-recording process in November 2020. In response, Shamrock released a statement: "We made this investment because we believe in the immense value and opportunity that comes with [Swift's] work. We fully respect and support her decision and, while we hoped to formally partner, we also knew [Swift's re-recording venture] was a possible outcome that we considered."

Swift's re-recordings 

Swift began releasing her re-recorded music in 2021. The re-recorded albums and songs are identified by the note "(Taylor's Version)" added to all of their titles, to distinguish them from the older recordings.

In February 2021, Swift announced that she had finished re-recording her Fearless and released "Love Story (Taylor's Version)", a re-recording of the album's lead single "Love Story", on February 12. Fearless (Taylor's Version) was released on April 9 to rave reviews from music critics, who praised Swift's move to re-record her music, viewing it as an act of preservation of artists' rights. On September 15, following a viral TikTok trend involving "Wildest Dreams" (2015) that was gaining traction, the older recording of the song accumulated 735,000 plays on Spotify, marking the highest single-day streams ever for the song on the streaming platform. On September 17, Swift teased the re-recorded song's bridge as part of the said trend with a snippet on TikTok, captioning "if you guys want to use my version of wildest dreams for the slow zoom trend, here she is!". "Wildest Dreams (Taylor's Version)" was subsequently released to streaming platforms. Swift stated that she saw "Wildest Dreams" trending on TikTok and thought fans should have "[her] version" of the song. In its first four hours of availability, "Wildest Dreams (Taylor's Version)" amassed 2,003,391 Spotify streams, breaking the record the older "Wildest Dreams" had set a few days prior.

On November 12, 2021, Swift released Red (Taylor's Version), the re-recorded issue of Red, consisting of all 30 songs that were originally meant for the 2012 version. The album broke several sales, streaming, and chart records, and was met with widespread acclaim, becoming her highest-rated album by critics on Metacritic. Its closing track, "All Too Well (10 Minute Version) (Taylor's Version) (From the Vault)", scored Swift the eighth Billboard Hot 100 number-one song of her career and garnered the Guinness World Record for the longest song ever to top the chart. The song's producer Jack Antonoff told Rolling Stone that a 10-minute-long song topping the Hot 100 teaches artists to "not listen" to what the industry has to say. "This Love (Taylor's Version)", a track from 1989 (Taylor's Version), was released on May 6, 2022. In September 2022, Swift reportedly turned down an offer to headline the Super Bowl LVII halftime show (2023), refusing to play the show until her re-recording process is finished.

In October 2022, Swift released the Easter egg-laden music video of "Bejeweled", a track on her tenth studio album Midnights. The video contains several hints to Speak Now, and incorporates orchestral versions of its two tracks, "Enchanted" and "Long Live"; fans and media outlets surmised that the next release would be Speak Now (Taylor's Version). In March 2023, ahead of the Eras Tour, Swift released a re-recording of the deluxe edition track "If This Was A Movie", along with re-recordings of "Safe & Sound" and "Eyes Open" from The Hunger Games: Songs from District 12 and Beyond.

Press investigation 
On November 16, 2020, Variety journalist Shirley Halperin reported, "some insiders speculate the value [of Swift's masters] could be as high as $450 million once certain earn-backs are factored in". According to a November 2021 report by Financial Times, Braun believed that Swift was "just bluffing" about re-recording. The newspaper stated that, after purchasing Big Machine, Braun began searching for buyers for the masters of Swift's back catalog, and that he and co-investors told potential buyers that Swift would not actually re-record the albums, calling her announcement an "empty threat"; Braun also told the buyers that Swift's posts about the dispute would only generate more publicity, boosting streams and downloads of the albums. Financial Times also alleged that the deal between Braun and Shamrock included "a post-purchase earnout to Braun and Carlyle Group, if sales and streams hit specific targets". On December 10, 2021, The New York Times published that the Carlyle Group contacted Braun and encouraged him to reach a ceasefire with Swift, such as a joint-venture partnership, to prevent her from re-recording, according to an undisclosed group of "four people close to the situation", three of whom said the firm was "unhappy to be dragged into the dispute in such a public way".

Business Insider reporter Anna Silman released an investigation exclusive in March 2022. Silman wrote that one of Swift's many reasons to detest Braun's procurement of the masters is his poor handling of the relationship between Justin Bieber and Selena Gomez, the latter being one of Swift's closest friends and vice versa. Silman also stated that Braun controlled news stories of several media outlets and blogs. American rapper Lil Twist told Silman that Braun used tabloid websites such as TMZ and Page Six to plant negative stories about the rapper. Silman claimed that Braun refused to speak on the record, and that many others were afraid to go on record due to Braun's "rep for litigiousness". Additionally, she stated that Braun's lawyer, Marty Singer, threatened Business Insider several times over the investigation, claiming Silman is biased and has "deep ties to the Taylor Swift camp."

Sale of Ithaca 
In April 2021, Braun merged Ithaca with South Korean entertainment company Hybe Corporation, which purchased Ithaca for a 100 percent stake through its wholly owned subsidiary, Hybe America. The deal, valued at $1 billion, brought the SB Projects and Big Machine rosters, including Bieber, Grande, Lovato, J Balvin, Thomas Rhett, Florida Georgia Line, and Lady A, together with K-pop acts like BTS, Tomorrow X Together, and Seventeen. Braun joined the board of Hybe. In a September 2022 interview with NPR's Jay Williams, Braun stated he regrets the way the Big Machine acquisition was handled, admitted he came from a "place of arrogance" when he assumed that he and Swift "could work things out", and that he learned "an important lesson". Braun also stated that he was forced to make the purchase under a "very strict NDA" and hence was not allowed to talk to anybody about it.

Reactions 
The controversy was highly publicized, drawing reactions and critiques from across the internet. Swift's re-recordings were one of the most widely discussed and covered news topics of 2020–2021, and were described by media outlets as one of 2021's most prominent pop-culture events. Evening Standard called it "music's biggest feud", because "back catalogues regularly change hands behind the scenes, but almost never make headlines". Hashtags "#IStandWithTaylor" and "#WeStandWithTaylor" trended worldwide on Twitter following Swift's post. Billboard wrote, since the controversy, acts "lined up for Team Swift or Team Braun, creating the most public battle about an artists' masters in recent memory".

Entertainment industry 

Swift's response and social media posts sparked support from many of her contemporaries. Musicians who openly supported her include Dionne Warwick, Anne Murray, Cher, Gomez, Halsey, Iggy Azalea, Sara Bareilles, Lily Allen, Tinashe, Ella Eyre, Hayley Kiyoko, Camila Cabello, Jordan Pruitt, Brendon Urie, Kelsea Ballerini, JoJo, Azealia Banks, The Regrettes, Echosmith, Antonoff, Haim, Alessia Cara, Allie X, Hrvy, Gretchen Peters, Iza, Katy Perry, and Anita Baker, who agreed with Swift that artists should rightfully own their music. American musician Sky Ferreira supported Swift and told about her own battle over her masters: "the entertainment industry is filled with under qualified bullies & morons with way too much power for their own good." When questioned about his stance, English singer-songwriter Ed Sheeran said "I have been speaking directly to [Swift], like I always do." American singer Kelly Clarkson, in a tweet, urged Swift to re-record the albums; "You should go in & re-record all the songs that you don't own the masters on exactly how you did them [...] I'd buy all of the new versions just to prove a point." Various other singers unfollowed Braun on their social media accounts. Beside musicians, celebrities like Cara Delevingne, Heidi Montag, Sara Sampaio, Martha Hunt, Gigi Hadid, Antoni Porowski, Bobby Berk, Ruby Rose, Jameela Jamil, Joseph Khan, Mike Birbiglia, and Mamrie Hart also supported Swift via social media posts.

A few musicians supported Braun, including Australian singer-songwriter Sia, American singer Ty Dolla Sign, and Braun's clients Bieber and Lovato. Lovato and Sia said they believe Braun is a "good man" and that his actions were not personal. American entertainer Todrick Hall, who was formerly a client of Braun, supported Swift and accused Braun of homophobia; Hall engaged in a back-and-forth argument with Lovato on Twitter. In an Instagram post, Bieber apologized to Swift for the FaceTime screenshot (with Braun and West) he posted in 2016 with a caption targeting her; however, Bieber defended Braun, saying Braun has supported Swift since she let Bieber be the opening act of her Fearless Tour and added "years have passed, we haven't crossed paths and gotten to communicate our differences, hurts or frustrations. So for you to take it to social media and get people to hate on Scooter isn't fair." Bieber's wife Hailey called him a "gentleman" under the post, which prompted Delevingne to criticize the Biebers for what she considered as insincere amity. Grande, also a client of Braun, posted an Instagram story congratulating Braun on the purchase but deleted it after Swift posted her statement. David Geffen, a music executive whom Braun has often described as a mentor, supported Braun but said "only time will tell who made the wise decision".

Politicians 

On November 19, 2019, US senator Elizabeth Warren, who was one of the Democratic candidates in the 2020 United States presidential election, stated on Twitter that Swift is "one of many" whose work has been threatened by private equity firms, who keep "gobbling up more and more of our economy, costing jobs and crushing entire industries." Holding private equity firms accountable was a large part of Warren's presidential campaign. US representative Alexandria Ocasio-Cortez also sided with Swift. She tweeted: "Private equity groups' predatory practices actively hurt millions of Americans. Their leveraged buyouts have destroyed the lives of retail workers across the country, scrapping 1+ million jobs. Now they're holding [Swift's] own music hostage. They need to be reined in."

American businessman Glenn Youngkin was the former co-CEO of the Carlyle Group, the major sponsor in Braun's purchase of Big Machine and Swift's masters. Youngkin contested in the 2021 Virginia gubernatorial election as the Republican candidate for the office of the Governor of Virginia. On October 6, 2021, ahead of the election, then-incumbent governor and Democrat candidate Terry McAuliffe launched a series of negative advertisements on Facebook, Instagram, and Google Search, tying Youngkin to the purchase. The ad included the slogan "#WeStandWithTaylor", a hashtag used by Swift's fans during the fallout of the dispute, and asked her supporters to vote for McAuliffe. Youngkin's spokesperson, Christian Martinez, stated "McAuliffe has reached the stage of desperation in his campaign where he's rolling out the most baseless attacks to see what sticks". Additionally, NPR highlighted a July 2021 report by Associated Press that claimed McAuliffe himself had invested a minimum of $690,000 in Carlyle between 2007 and 2016. McAuliffe's spokesperson, Renzo Olivari, confirmed that McAuliffe was a "passive" Carlyle investor by 2019, at the time of the sale of the masters, owned less than $5,000 in Carlyle stock.

Jared Polis, the 43rd Governor of Colorado, mentioned Swift's re-recording venture as a highlight of 2021 in his annual gubernatorial address to the state on January 14, 2022, and sang the chorus of "22 (Taylor's Version)" in reference to the new year of 2022.

Contemporary critics 
Publications highlighted Swift's public opposition to the acquisition as trailblazing: while the issue of master ownership and the conflicts between record labels and artists such as Prince, the Beatles, Janet Jackson, and Def Leppard have been prevalent, Swift was one of the few to make it public. Rolling Stone journalists described the dispute as one of the 50 "most important moments" of the 2010s. Dominic Rushe of The Guardian said Swift's situation hinted at a change in the digital music era, where artists are more informed of their ownership and would not rely on record labels for marketing as heavily as in the past. Recognizing the visibility she brought to "one of the music industry's longest standing issues", Pitchfork critic Sam Sodomsky said Swift "is also so huge—not just an artist but a brand—that she can enact change by wielding the leverage of the reliability of her success", and that when she makes a statement, it is "financially lucrative for the industry to listen". The Evening Standard Katie Rosseinsky wrote, "it is not just another celebrity feud, this could have wide-reaching repercussions for the music industry."

The New York Times, The A.V. Club and MarketWatch felt Swift's criticism targeted private equity firms, highlighting her mention of the Carlyle Group in her social media posts. The New York Times said, "at a time of public outrage over corporate greed and a heightened awareness of gender-based power dynamics, the 29-year-old Ms. Swift was able to turn a commercial dispute into a cause célèbre." Meera Jagannathan of MarketWatch described the  Carlyle Group as a "powerful and politically connected" firm based in Washington, D.C., whose investments constitute a global portfolio of 272 companies, including Supreme, Dunkin' Brands, and many aerospace and defense companies.

Critical commentary on Swift's decision to re-record remained favorable as well. Variety Chris Willman wrote that Swift's highly publicized move to re-record her back catalog would inspire other artists to "further deputize or weaponize fans in their own business disputes", unlike comparatively less successful attempts by her contemporaries to own their music. The Atlantic Spencer Kornhaber opined that the re-recordings have been "a dazzling victory lap", disproving industry observers who had doubted Swift. Elle Fawzia Khan and The New Yorker Carrie Battan hailed the "(Taylor's Version)" tag attached to the re-recorded music as genius re-branding of Swift's back catalog. Charlotte Richards, writing for Money Marketing, said the situation helps understand "dangerous investing", such as Braun's. The New Zealand Herald reporter Lydia Burgham dubbed the move "ultimate middle finger to the bureaucracy of the music industry", while revealing how "even someone of Swift's star power cannot hold on to the rights to her recorded work." With the success of Red (Taylor's Version), Hannah Towey of Business Insider said "the Taylor's Version era is already sending shockwaves throughout the industry."

The Wall Street Journal journalist Neil Shah wrote, for using her back catalog in mass media, such as for commercials and movies, Swift can shut out Shamrock and Braun by directly lending the concerned song to the third party, approving the copyright license herself. Kate Dwyer of Marie Claire said the re-recorded albums free Swift from the sexist tabloid scrutiny of her private life that overshadowed her past works, by re-introducing listeners and critics to the same songs but without "as much gender bias", and that the audiences who "didn't believe she was a feminist before (for whatever, sexist reason) can't deny the feminist undertones of becoming the industry spokesperson for artists' rights."

Scholars 
Various lawyers and law firms have published their analyses of the controversy. The majority highlighted the lack of legal grounds and that a lawsuit is not viable. Susan H. Hilderley, music attorney at University of California's Los Angeles School of Law, told The Washington Post that Swift not owning her masters is "nothing out of the ordinary". Hilderley noted Swift was an unknown artist when she signed her record deal and that signing off the masters to the record label is the "kind of terms" usually followed in artist-label agreements. In a similar vein, Erin Jacobson, a music attorney specializing in artist-label negotiations, said on CBC News that "the structure of a label owning the master has been in place for such a long time that a lot of people are just used to that". She affirmed that Swift has no legal recourse on the contract but can effect change in the music industry and benefit all artists. The Hollywood Reporter consulted music lawyers Howard King and Derek Crownover regarding the controversy; King said Swift would not sue Braun or the label because of the "personal" nature of the dispute—her predicament being not the sale itself but that Braun is the buyer—having no legal recourse. In agreement, Crownover said: "from the satellite view, I don't see any legal ramifications that could come of this, unless there were restrictions on the sale of the masters to third parties." James Jeffries-Chung of Norton Rose Fulbright asserted Shamrock cannot prevent Swift from re-recording her music by any legal measure since she is the publisher of her songs and that all they can hope is "listeners may be less interested in hearing modern takes of songs they enjoyed a decade ago and stick with the originals."

Many opined that Swift's moves will bring about systemic changes in the music industry and artist-label relationships. Meredith Rose, senior policy counsel at Public Knowledge, wrote in her American Bar Association post that "if Swift—who is, without exaggeration, one of the biggest powerhouse pop stars of an entire generation—can't get her own masters back, who could? Turns out, almost nobody." According to Tonya Butler, professor and chair of the Music Business Management Department at Berklee College of Music, "regardless of the reasons why [Swift is] re-recording, whether it's spite or good business, the fact she is bringing to attention the re-recording restriction agreement alone makes the whole controversy valuable."  McBrayer's Peter J. Rosene stated that each "Taylor's Version" album lowers the value of the master of its respective original held by Shamrock and predicted that the sales of the re-recordings "might, in fact, outperform the original albums." American author Steve Stoute said "you build it; we make you think that you own it; you act like you own it; but at the end of the day, we own it." He opined that Swift's dilemma is a "painful" illustration of the fundamental issue with the music business that has been following a "sharecropping" model. According to professor R. Polk Wagner of the University of Pennsylvania Law School, Swift associating her lyrics with a range of goods and services through trademark applications represents her understanding that "she is bigger than the music". He added "it's more of a branding right, thinking of Taylor Swift as a conglomerate." Doug McMahon of Irish firm McCann Fitzgerald LLP opined that the controversy shows how "the bundle of related copyrights that exist in a piece of music can give rise to complex disputes" and upheld Swift's move to re-record as a "relatively novel solution", in regards to the copyright legislations in Ireland.

Legacy

Recognition 
At the 2019 Billboard Women in Music event, Swift was conferred the inaugural Woman of the Decade award for the 2010s. In her acceptance speech, Swift addressed Braun for the first time publicly, criticizing his "toxic male privilege" and the "unregulated world of private equity coming in and buying [artists'] music as if it's real estate—as if it's an app or a shoe line." She claimed that none of the investors "bothered to contact me or my team directly—to perform their due diligence on their investment; on their investment in me. To ask how I might feel about the new owner of my art, the music I wrote, the videos I created, photos of me, my handwriting, my album designs."

In December 2021, Billboard recognized Swift as "The Greatest Pop Star of 2021", saying she "rewrote industry rules and had one of the most impactful years of her storied pop career without even releasing an entirely new album." The magazine stated that the "unequivocal success" of Fearless (Taylor's Version) and Red (Taylor's Version) prove the widespread acceptance of the recordings, which replaced the older versions as "the ones listeners will be digesting and caring about moving forward." The Recording Academy said the "Taylor's Versions" are a music trend that defined 2021. Swift and her re-recording venture were featured in a video montage by Vox summarizing major world events of the year. Rolling Stone listed Braun's purchase of Swift's masters as one of the 50 worst decisions made in the music industry history, and noted Swift's role in shifting the public perception of the concept of re-recording or re-mastering.

Financial impact 
The re-recordings were widely successful. The original Fearless was charting at number 157 on the US Billboard 200 chart before the impact of Fearless (Taylor's Version), after which the original dropped 19 percent in sales and fell off the chart completely, while the re-recording debuted at number one. Ben Sisario of The New York Times opined that Fearless (Taylor's Version) "accomplished what appeared to be one of Swift's goals: burying the original Fearless." International Federation of the Phonographic Industry reported her as the world's best-selling soloist and female artist of 2021. Forbes estimated her 2021 earnings to be US$52,000,000, and opined that Swift "recreating her catalog also sets [her] up for a potentially massive payday". Her publication rights over her first six albums were valued at $200 million in 2022. Rolling Stone reported in January 2022 that Swift was the highest-paid female musician of 2021, owing to Fearless (Taylor's Version) and Red (Taylor's Version), ahead of artists who released brand new albums that year. In December 2022, Billboard reiterated that Swift was the top earning musician overall in 2021, taking home an estimated $65.8 million, followed by English band the Rolling Stones ($55.5 million).

Synchronization 

Swift has pointedly refused to authorize synchronization requests for the original versions of her songs from her first six albums, advising use of her re-recorded versions instead. American actor and Swift's brother, Austin, manages the licensing of her songs. A cover version of "Look What You Made Me Do" (2017), the lead single of Reputation, was featured in the opening credits of an episode (aired May 24, 2020) of spy thriller series Killing Eve. The artist credited as the performer of the cover, Jack Leopards & the Dolphin Club, had no documented existence before the song's release. It was fronted by an unnamed male vocalist, speculated by some media outlets to be Austin, and was produced by Jack Antonoff and Nils Sjöberg, the latter being a pseudonym of Swift. Because Swift could not re-record Reputation at the time the episode aired, some believed that the cover version was Swift's way of bypassing the potential issues that would arise with Big Machine over licensing the copyright to Killing Eve. A copyright license is mandatory for using a song in a visual work; otherwise, the owner of the copyright is allowed to fine or press charges against the party who used the song unlicensed.

The re-recorded tracks have been featured in various visual media: "Love Story (Taylor's Version)" appeared in an advertisement produced by American actor Ryan Reynolds for the dating app Match.com. "Wildest Dreams (Taylor's Version)" was extensively used in the trailers for the animated adventure film Spirit Untamed (2021) and in an episode of Netflix fantasy series Fate: The Winx Saga (2022). The trailer for Amazon Prime Video romantic drama series The Summer I Turned Pretty (2022), posted on May 5, 2022, made use of parts of "This Love (Taylor's Version)". "Message in a Bottle" (2021) and the unreleased "Bad Blood (Taylor's Version)" are featured in animated superhero film DC League of Super-Pets (2022).

According to Billboard, filmmakers are aware that "Swift songs in scenes or trailers instantly build streaming and ticket-buying audiences" and "music supervisors are happy play along." Mike Knobloch, president of music and publishing in American mass media corporation NBC Universal (which released Spirit Untamed) and who also worked with Swift's team for the Fifty Shades Darker track "I Don't Wanna Live Forever" (2016), claimed that "Swift is exposing new music to the widest possible audience. For now, her strategy focuses on family films, but that approach is unlikely to last forever [...] She's on a short list of artists that are impactful to the broadest audience. If that translates to family films as a target, then that makes sense. But I don't think she's doing that exclusively."

Fan activity 
Journalists and media outlets credited Swift's fans, known commonly as "Swifties", with aiding Swift in magnifying the publicity surrounding the controversy and the success of her re-recording efforts. Whereas, Braun claimed that Swift "weaponized" her fanbase by making the dispute public.

On June 30, 2019, following the news that Braun had acquired Big Machine—and along with it Swift's back catalog—many of Braun's friends congratulated him on their social media accounts; American entrepreneur David Grutman captioned a screenshot of the news headline with "WHEN YOUR FRIEND BUYS TAYLOR SWIFT" in his Instagram story, which Braun re-posted to his account. The story and its re-post were quickly deleted after Swift's fans claimed it as reflecting Braun's true intent. On November 22, 2019, Braun posted on Instagram claiming he received death threats from Swift's fans, and wanted to have a conversation with Swift regarding the dispute. He wrote, "I am certain there is no situation ever worth jeopardising anyone's safety." Big Machine headquarters in Nashville was shut down early on November 14, 2019, due to "direct and hostile death threats" made to the company's employees. An online petition launched by a fan on Change.org, calling Braun, Borchetta and the Carlyle Group "to stop holding Swift's art hostage", garnered 35,000 plaintiffs in its first three hours. Michael Jones, managing director of campaigns in Change.org, described the petition as "one the fastest-growing petitions on the platform this month".

Fans also mined information about the Carlyle Group and claimed it has ties to the civil war in Yemen. Subsequently, publications such as The New York Times confirmed that Carlyle owns the aerospace manufacturer Wesco Aircraft Holdings, which supplies parts for building Saudi Arabian combat aircraft that are used to drop bombs in Yemen. Following the release of Fearless (Taylor's Version), fans blocked the tracks of Fearless (2008) on their digital music platforms, such as Spotify, to prevent accidentally streaming it—in order to make the older recordings "disappear". On the May 12, 2022 episode of The Tonight Show Starring Jimmy Fallon, in his opening monologue, host Jimmy Fallon summarized several fan speculations about the next re-recorded album from Swift, theorizing that it is either Speak Now (Taylor's Version), 1989 (Taylor's Version), or both at the same time.

Peer acknowledgment 

 American singer-songwriter Olivia Rodrigo stated that she negotiated with her record label to own her music's masters herself, after observing Swift's battle.
 American singer Joe Jonas said that he wishes to re-record the Jonas Brothers' back catalog just like Swift.
 Canadian musician Bryan Adams stated he re-recorded his back catalog following a disagreement with his record label, and thanked Swift for inspiring him to do so.
 American rock band the Departed also credited her with inspiring them to re-record.
 American rapper Snoop Dogg cited Swift's re-recordings and stated he wanted to re-record his debut album, Doggystyle (1993), but could not bring himself to do it because he was unable to replicate the "feeling".
 American singer-songwriter Ashanti announced her intention to re-record her self-titled debut album to gain its masters, and told Metro that she felt "empowered" by Swift; Ashanti further stated "I think Taylor is amazing for what she's done and to be able to be a female in this very male-dominated industry, to accomplish that is amazing. Owning your property and getting a chance to have ownership of your creativity is so so important. Male, female, singer, rapper, whatever, I hope this is a lesson for artists to get in there and own."
 Indonesian singer-songwriter Niki stated Swift inspired her to re-record and "reimagine"  her original songs that she had deleted from YouTube after signing to her record label and that these re-recorded tracks will be a part of her second studio album, Nicole (2022).
 American socialite Paris Hilton released an "updated" version of her 2006 song, "Stars Are Blind", re-titled as "Stars are Blind (Paris' Version)", on December 30, 2022.
 American R&B singer SZA praised Swift in her 2023 Billboard Woman of the Year interview: "Taylor letting that whole situation go with her masters, then selling all of those f–king records. That’s the biggest 'f–k you' to the establishment I've ever seen in my life, and I deeply applaud that sh-t."
 British singer Rita Ora thanked Swift for providing an incentive to purchase her masters herself.

Systemic changes 

On November 12, 2021, The Wall Street Journal reported that Universal Music Group, the parent company of Swift's current label, has doubled the amount of time that restricts artists from re-recording their works in their recording deals hereafter. The newspaper said the change represents "shifting power dynamics in the music business", as artists have started to demand better revenue shares and ownership of the masters to their music, incentivized by Swift's situation. Weverse said "the recording industry had been watching [Swift's] rerecording project closely to see where it might go and has recently begun to react" and pointed out that musicians have started to demand the rights to their masters "more and more often" following the controversy.

On November 17, 2021, iHeartRadio announced that its radio stations will only play "Taylor's Version" songs henceforth, with plans to replace the rest of the older recordings with the re-recorded tracks as they are officially released.

Music inspiration 
Songs from each of Swift's 2020 albums, "My Tears Ricochet" and "Mad Woman" from Folklore, and "It's Time to Go" from Evermore, were underscored by critics for their references to the dispute, Borchetta, and Braun. "My Tears Ricochet" is about how Swift felt betrayed by Borchetta and uses a funeral metaphor, while "Mad Woman" is about the "gaslighting" Swift experienced at the hands of Braun. Widespread interpretation has that the tracks "Vigilante Shit" and "Karma" from her 2022 album, Midnights, also diss Braun.

Academic attention 
The controversy has also been a topic of study in higher educational institutions. On October 4, 2021, Rafael Landívar University in Guatemala hosted a conference on the topic "International Copyright Protection: Analyzing Taylor Swift's Case". In January 2022, a spring semester course focusing on Swift's career and its cultural impact was launched at New York University's Tisch School of the Arts, with "copyright and ownership" as one of the topics covered by the syllabus. Queen's University at Kingston offers a fall semester course, titled "Taylor Swift's Literary Legacy (Taylor's Version)", focusing on her sociopolitical impact on contemporary culture; its syllabus includes studying select songs from Swift's studio albums, with the use of re-recorded versions wherever possible.

See also 
 Taylor Swift sexual assault trial
 2022 Ticketmaster controversy
 Britney Spears conservatorship dispute
 Kesha v. Dr. Luke

Footnotes

References 

Masters controversy
Music controversies